Wonders of the Monsoon (also known as Lands of the Monsoon) is a BBC documentary series which ran for five episodes between 5 October 2014 and 2 November 2014, and aired on BBC Two. The series focus for a variety of locations around the world features including India, Australia and islands of the Pacific Ocean which are all the focus of the monsoon rains.

The series was composed by Nitin Sawhney and narrated by Colin Salmon.

Episodes 
All original and international episode names were given from BBC website. All broadcast dates refer to the original UK transmission.

Merchandise 
A two-disc DVD and two-disc Blu-ray set for the series were released on 17 November 2014.

In Australia and New Zealand, DVD was released by ABC DVD/Village Roadshow on 21 October 2015.

References

External links
 
 Lands of the Monsoon at BBC Earth Asia
 

2014 British television series debuts
2014 British television series endings
2010s British documentary television series
BBC television documentaries
Documentary films about nature
English-language television shows